South Ossetia is an autonomous region in Georgia, approximately  above sea level on the slopes of the Greater Caucasus. Although it declared independence in 2008, only a few countries (such as Russia) acknowledge it. The region is inhabited by Ossetians, an Iranian ethnic group. According to Russia, Nicaragua, Venezuela, Syria and Nauru, it is one of the world's newest independent states. All other states and international organisations consider South Ossetia an autonomous region of Georgia, functioning as a de facto state for twenty years after declaring independence and conducting a successful armed rebellion. Its Georgian inhabitants have been displaced. South Ossetia has been a source of tension for a number of years, with Georgia and Russia's political differences impeding peaceful independence and breeding a turbulent series of events which undermine the Universal Declaration of Human Rights.

History
During the 13th century, the Ossetians are believed to have moved into the regions of North and South Ossetia. They were related to the nomadic Alans; osiderives from Georgian. Alanic tribes in the North Caucasus formed a kingdom knows as Alania during the ninth century, which was bordered by Arabs and the Byzantine Empire. Although the mountains were a natural defence, Alania was destroyed by the Mongols in 1230. The remaining Alans fled further into the Caucasus Mountains and settled in Ossetia, which were part of the Kingdom of Georgia. The political climate deteriorated, opening the door to Russian annexation.

Russian occupation
A peasant uprising began in South Ossetia in 1918, which was forcefully suppressed by a Georgian Menshevik force led by Jaliko Jugheli. A Russian force crossed the border and attacked the Georgian army and guard, provoking further violence. Amid heavy casualties, thousands of Ossetians fled to Soviet Russia. Many villages were burnt, and previously fertile land was destroyed. The relationship between the Georgians and the Ossetians deteriorated between 1918 and 1920, with the Georgian government accusing the Ossetians of allying with the Bolsheviks. Riots, rebellions and battles killed thousands of people, in addition to deaths from starvation and disease. Menshevik Georgia introduced its constitution in early 1921, with no mention of autonomous districts and related legislation. On 25 February 1921, the Red Army entered Georgia and established Bolshevik rule.

Georgian oblast
The Red Army invasion ended the Democratic Republic of Georgia. North and South Ossetia were incorporated by the Soviet Union as separate regions. North Ossetia was an oblast of the Russian Soviet Federative Socialist Republic from 1924 to 1936, and became an autonomous republic within the RSFSR in 1936. South Ossetia was an oblast of the Georgian Soviet Socialist Republic. Although Russian and Georgian were official languages, the Ossetians were permitted to use their language (including in schools). Several unsuccessful attempts were made during the 1920s to unify North and South Ossetia, and Georgia's intention to control both regions was rejected.

1990s unrest
The communist South Ossetian authorities declared sovereignty on 20 September 1990 as part of the USSR. Tensions increased, with ethnic Georgians believing that they were being dispossessed. Georgian president Zviad Gamsakhurdia removed South Ossetian autonomy, declaring a state of emergency which intensified South Ossetian demands for unification with North Ossetia. The strained relations bred a rapid increase in nationalist militias. Georgian police entered Tskhinvali (the South Ossetian capital) on 5 January 1991, beginning the 1991–1992 South Ossetia War. War crimes were committed by both sides; over 250 people were killed, and at least 485 were wounded.

Russian President Boris Yeltsin and the 1992 election of Eduard Shevardnadze as president of Georgia encouraged a more harmonious relationship between the ethnic groups. The Dagomys agreements endorsed a joint peacekeeping force in the conflict zone to stabilise and monitor conditions and the Joint Control Commission for Georgian–Ossetian Conflict Resolution oversaw the region's peacekeeping forces. Russia's role in peacekeeping was solidified by a 1994 agreement. South Ossetia withdrew its resolution to leave Georgia, and a quadruple peacekeeping force (Georgia, Russia, and North and South Ossetia) was in operation. Lyudvig Chibirov was elected as the first president of South Ossetia in November 1996, and further agreements were signed between Georgia and Russia to restore South Ossetia's economy and accommodate returning refugees.

2008 war

In 2008, a number of NATO members (including Georgia) participated in the annual Partnership for Peace Sea Breeze exercise in the Black Sea. Western operations in the area were often followed by Russian ones. One, Caucasian Frontier 2008, was conducted on 5 July. Many interpret this as very suspicious event of what was to occur in the following days. Incidents often took place around the region of South Ossetia, but those of 2008 seemed to be more sinister and vigorous. Rival Provisional Administration of South Ossetia leader Dmitry Sanakoyev had survived a bombing for which the South Ossetian president, Eduard Kokoity's, government was blamed. Russian jets began flying over South Ossetia, and Georgia was complaining about Ossetian alleged shelling of Georgian land and villages by the end of July. Georgian president Mikheil Saakashvili outlined the regional hostilities in a letter submitted by Georgia's UN ambassador to the UN Security Council and General Assembly. Saakashvili's letter indicated attacks on Georgian police and peacekeeping posts and persistent, large-scale attacks on civilians and villages. Ossetians reported that villages and residential areas had been targeted on 1 August, with six Ossetians killed and others wounded. According to Tbilisi, Georgian forces were responding to incoming fire.

Due to the unrest, Tskhinvali was partially evacuated as a precaution; however, media, journalists and leaders attempted to reassure South Ossetia that there would be no all-out war. Saakashvili's forces began Operation Clean Field. News began to circle about the Georgian shelling of South Ossetia's capital, Tskhinvali with rocket systems, large guns, resulting in numerous casualties in various villages such as Dmenis, Tsunar and Kvernet. Although Russian UN ambassador Vitaly Churkin called for an emergency Security Council meeting, no immediate ceasefire was secured. Georgia reportedly controlled several South Ossetian villages, and fighting continued in Tskhinvali. The command post of the joint peacekeeping force was involved in the hostilities (with casualties), and residents were in basement shelters for up to 16 hours.

Russia attacked and occupied Gori, controlling operations in Ossetia, and Saakashvili said that he would recall troops from Iraq. The United Nations Security Council met on 8 August to discuss apparent human-rights violations of human rights, and condemned the Russian bombing as undermining Georgian sovereignty and territorial integrity. The United States ordered Russia to cease its attacks in Georgia and withdraw all forces from Georgian territory.

Human-rights violations
Russia has extended the South Ossetian border into Georgia several times, with the most significant (and recent) case in July 2015 when barbed-wire fences were moved by Russian border guards further into Georgia. This was in defiance of European Union (EU) policy, since the Russian troops impacted ethnic Georgian villages in South Ossetia and Russia. Border expansion began covertly in 2008, and has continued until the present; cameras have been installed to monitor movement on the border. This evidently affects Georgian shepherds, who are accused of trespassing and frequently fined and arrested while moving their flocks. The South Ossetian minister of foreign affairs has not addressed Russia's border-expansion operations.

Russian forces have significant control over South Ossetian territory; the penetration of Russian border guards into Georgian territory undermines human rights and raises national-security concerns about the Baku–Supsa Pipeline. The Organization for Security and Co-operation in Europe (OSCE) aims to restrict Russia's role in Transcaucasia, referring to events in South Ossetia as "ethnic cleansing and mass expulsion of the Kartvelian (Georgian) people and communities".

Progress
After the 2008 war, the EU, OSCE and UN co-chaired the Geneva International Discussions (GID). The talks, involving Georgia, Russia Abkhazia, South Ossetia and the United States, addressed non-violent solutions in the region (despite Russia's heavy military presence) and the return of internally displaced persons.

The European Union Monitoring Mission in Georgia (EUMM) has been in operation since the end of 2008. The mission monitors the Georgian, Russian and South Ossetian borders daily, documents any troop movements, and engages with the community to assess potential insurgency in the region. South Ossetia has prohibited the EUMM, however, from entering their territory.

References

Related reading
 
 
 
 
 </ref>
 Amnesty International. 2008. Civilians in the Line of Fire: The Georgia-Russia Conflict. London: Amnesty International, November 18.
 Broers, Laurence 2008 Filling the void: ethnic politics and nationalities policy in post-conflict Georgia, in Nationalities Papers 36.2, 275–304
 

South Ossetia
South Ossetia
Politics of South Ossetia
Human rights in Georgia (country)